Michel Muller (born 9 September 1966) is a French actor, screenwriter and director. He is most recently known for playing Charles VIII of France in the television series The Borgias.

Biography
Michel Muller was born 1966 in Vienna, Austria. He left graduate school to pursue a career in entertainment. He started as a one-man show performer, performing in theaters across France. He appeared in various French television series and in minor film roles. In 2001, he starred in Wasabi, alongside Jean Reno and Ryōko Hirosue.

In 2011, he appeared in four episodes of The Borgias, which was broadcast in the United States and Canada.

He won a Genie Award for Best Supporting Actor in 2007 for his role in The Little Book of Revenge (Guide de la petite vengeance).

Filmography

Film

Television

References

External links

1966 births
Living people
French male film actors
French male television actors
Austrian emigrants to France
Male actors from Vienna